Koss Corporation is a company in Milwaukee, Wisconsin, US that manufactures headphones. The company introduced the first high fidelity stereophones.

History 

John C. Koss founded the J.C. Koss Hospital Television Rental Company in 1953. After a short time Koss was looking for new ideas, and partnered with Martin Lange to eventually develop a stereo headphone. Based in Milwaukee, Wisconsin, United States, in 1991 Koss Audio & Video Electronics started producing and selling consumer electronics products as a separate company in Hazelwood, Missouri, United States. The Koss family owns more than 75% of the firm.

Having only a high school education, John C. Koss worked with Lange, an engineer, to develop the headphone that launched the company almost by accident, as they came upon the headphone idea as a result of an attempt to market a portable phonograph. What made this product unique was the privacy switch feature, which gave listeners the opportunity to listen to the first Koss SP/3 Stereophones. Initially, the product's purpose was to demonstrate to consumers the high-fidelity stereo sound of the portable phonograph.

Until then headphones had only been used in communications applications. In 1958 the design was introduced at a hi-fi trade show in Milwaukee, and audiences approved of it. Soon after the trade show, Koss went into business manufacturing and marketing stereophones from his basement apartment. The technology was imitated by competing manufacturers.

In the early 1970s, Koss worked out of two locations near each other. One was Koss TV-Rental, which also did electronics and musical instrument repairs; the second was the main facility two blocks to the east. At this time, Koss pioneered the high-end "electro-static" "ES series" headphone market. These headphones set the standard for wide-range frequency response. Being very durable, they required service for wear and tear on cords and earpads during their lifespan, by K&M Electronics (Klenworth & Midwest based in Minneapolis), working out of the TV Rental location. Koss headphones were easy and cost-effective to repair. At this site, a separate garage was set up to support the musical instrument and electronics repair business. The TV rental and repair site was managed by John's brother Pete Koss. Eventually, Koss dominated the headphone market, competing mainly with Telex. Koss was considered a higher quality unit at the time, offering a wide line of models.

In the late 1970s, to accommodate rapid growth, Koss moved to its present location on the north side of Milwaukee.

in the 1980s, Koss tried to diversify, unsuccessfully, into related areas of electronics; in 1984 the company filed for bankruptcy protection after a net loss that year of US$6 million (equivalent to $ million in ). Koss emerged from Chapter 11 bankruptcy proceedings in 1985.

In 1991, Michael J. Koss, son of founder John C. Koss, took over as president and chief executive officer.

In December 2009, former vice president of finance Sujata "Sue" Sachdeva was charged in federal court with wire fraud after the firm discovered her embezzlement of US$34 million (equivalent to $ million in ), and sentenced to eleven years in federal prison, of which she served six years. Koss was forced to restate five years of financials. It was able to recoup over US$12 million from its former auditor, from Sachdeva's credit card company, and by auctioning Sachdeva's stolen merchandise.

In 2020, Koss sued Apple, Bose, JLAB Audio, Plantronics Inc., and Skullcandy for patent infringement including. In July 2022 Koss and Apple reached a settlement for an undisclosed amount regarding the alleged patent infringement on Koss' intellectual property 

During the 2021 Gamestop Short Squeeze, the executives and directors of Koss earned US$40 million by selling company stock. This was more than the value of the Koss Corporation at the end of 2020.

Products 

Koss headphones were also sold in RadioShack stores under their own brand. The Koss Plug and Koss Spark Plug are in-ear passive noise-isolating earphones; they can be adapted to take the high-end Etymotics ear tip, becoming  the "Koss Hybrid". Other models include the  Koss Porta Pro and well-regarded budget-priced headphones including the KSC series. Since 1989, all headphones manufactured in North America by KOSS come with a limited lifetime warranty covering normal use by the initial owner. Returning to the pre-Koss use of headphones, Koss produces communications headsets with microphone.

Notes

References 

 Bednarek, David I., 'Koss Corp. May Be Suffering from Wall Street's Low Interest,' Milwaukee Journal, September 1, 1991.

External links

 

Manufacturing companies based in Milwaukee
Audio equipment manufacturers of the United States
Headphones manufacturers
Electronics companies established in 1953
Companies listed on the Nasdaq
1953 establishments in Wisconsin
American brands